Marnie is a 1961 novel by Winston Graham.

Marnie may also refer to:

People
 Marni, a given name, including a list of people named Marni and Marnie
 Helen Marnie (born 1978), Scottish singer-songwriter known mononymously as Marnie

Entertainment
Marnie (film), a 1964 adaptation of the novel directed by Alfred Hitchcock
Marnie (opera), a 2017 opera by Nico Muhly
The title character in When Marnie Was There, a Japanese anime film written and directed by Hiromasa Yonebayashi
Marnie Piper, the protagonist in the Halloweentown series, fantasy horror TV films that aired on Disney Channel
Marnie Nightingale, a character in UK soap opera Hollyoaks
Marnie Marie Michaels, a character in the HBO series Girls
Marnie, a character from Pokémon Sword and Shield

Other uses
Marnie, West Virginia, an unincorporated community
Marnie (dog), an American dog made famous through social media

See also
Marney, a surname